Uruguayan Venezuelans are people born in Uruguay who live in Venezuela, or Venezuelan-born people of Uruguayan descent. Modern estimates put the figure of Uruguayans in Venezuela at ca. 9,000.

Overview
Many Uruguayan-born persons live in Venezuela, for a number of reasons. Both countries share the Spanish language; the historical origins of both nations is common (part of the Spanish Empire until the early 19th century); Venezuela has a bigger economy, which attracted Uruguayans in search of opportunities; and, from the political point of view, during the civic-military dictatorship of Uruguay (1973-1985) Venezuela remained democratic, so some Uruguayans went into exile in Venezuela. However, in recent years of Chavismo, some have returned to Uruguay.

Uruguayan residents in Venezuela have their own institutions, for instance, the Uruguayan-Venezuelan Center and the Consultative Council in Caracas.

Notable people
Carlos Aragone, physicist
Rodrigo Arocena, mathematician 
Arturo Ardao, historian of ideas
 Ariel Britos, musician and conductor
Camila Canabal Sapelli,  TV hostess and Youtuber
Ariel Fedullo, comedian
Daniel Francovig, football player and coach
Rodolfo Gambini, physicist
Damián Genovese, telenovela actor and model
Beatriz Lockhart, composer
Carlos Maldonado, football player and coach
Walter Martinez, journalist
 Antonio Mastrogiovanni, composer
 Norberto Mazza, Journalist, host of Grado 33 of Globovisión 
Gabriel Miranda, football player and coach
 Joseph Novoa, filmmaker
Gustavo Núñez, musician
Nicolás Pereira, tennis player
Pignanelli, football player and coach
Vanessa Pose, telenovela actress
Angel Rama, writer
Walter Roque, football player and coach
Ariel Severino, scenographer
Ugo Ulive, actor, director and scenographer

See also
Uruguay–Venezuela relations
Venezuelans in Uruguay
Emigration from Uruguay

References

Ethnic groups in Venezuela
 
Venezuela